Cat-Tails for Two is a 1953 Warner Bros. Merrie Melodies cartoon, directed by Robert McKimson and written by Tedd Pierce. The short was released on August 29, 1953. It was the first appearance of Speedy Gonzales, in a prototype form. Because this cartoon's rendition of Speedy Gonzales looked rather coarse, they redesigned him for future cartoon releases.

The cartoon has been criticized for its stereotypical and insensitive depictions of Mexicans.

Plot
The two cats pursuing Speedy in Cat-Tails for Two are the slow-witted (and injury-causing) Benny and the fully functioning but unfortunate George, both patterned after the characters Lennie and George in the novel Of Mice and Men. George and Benny are walking down a pier looking for food, when they find a Mexican ship. Figuring the ship will have plenty of Mexican mice, i.e. "Mexican food" (Benny: "It gives me the heartburn and I love it!"), they climb on, only to find an unkempt mouse calling himself "Speedy Gonzales: The Fastest Mouse in All Mexico".

George and Benny go through numerous attempts to capture Speedy, who always outwits them. Speedy comes to think of them as private entertainment, at one point declaring "I like those fellows. All the time having fon (fun)!" Among the cats' failed attempts:

1. A crate full of "Acme Anvils" set above a piece of cheese. With Benny holding the rope and George setting the bait, Speedy gives Benny a scare from behind, causing him to let go of the rope and the crate to flatten George. As punishment, George swings down on Benny's cranium with a mallet, but the mallet bounces off Benny's head right on top of his own! When Benny asks "Why did you hit yourself on the head for, George?", the slap-happy cat answers: "I like it, I like it!!"

2. George sets up seven pieces of cheese with dynamite-stick booby traps throughout the ship, but doesn't have a match to light the sticks. Speedy taunts George with a match and sets him up to take the explosions. Benny comes to the rescue by cooling George down, but misinterprets a bucket of petrol as "a funny way to spell 'water'" leaving him half furless.

3. A pipe with one end disguised as an entranceway to a cabaret and Benny standing at the other end with a mallet. When Speedy enters the pipe, George fires a skyrocket in behind him, the idea being to force Speedy out into the path of the mallet. But the rocket unexpectedly yanks George through the pipe behind it. Speedy is too fast for Benny, and Benny ends up clobbering George when he is pulled out the other side turning his head into a mallet size.

Finally, the two cats run a pipe into Speedy's hiding place (to the tune of Raymond Scott's Powerhouse), but Speedy grabs a wrench and bends the pipe back around to the cats, unbeknownst to them. George starts shoving a lot of dynamite into the pipe, resulting in a mountain of TNT piling up behind him and Benny. When George is done shoving dynamite through the pipe, he lights the last stick with a match, and the mountain of dynamite blasts him and Benny up into the air. As they descend, Benny asks George about their Mexican dinner, with George responding "I kind of lost my appetite for Mexican food," before both cats plunge into the harbor. A smug Speedy looks at the camera and declares "I love those fellows. They're so see-lee (silly)!"

Voice cast
Mel Blanc as Speedy Gonzales, George, and Benny's screaming
Stan Freberg as Benny (uncredited)

References

External links
 

1953 animated films
1953 short films
1950s Warner Bros. animated short films
Merrie Melodies short films
Films directed by Robert McKimson
1950s American animated films
Films scored by Carl Stalling
1953 films
Animated films about cats
Animated films about mice
1950s English-language films
Speedy Gonzales films
Films set on ships